Big is a 1988 American fantasy comedy-drama film directed by Penny Marshall and stars Tom Hanks as Josh Baskin, a pre-adolescent boy whose wish to be "big" transforms him physically into an adult. The film also stars Elizabeth Perkins, David Moscow, John Heard, and Robert Loggia, and was written by Gary Ross and Anne Spielberg. It was produced by Gracie Films and distributed by 20th Century Fox.

Upon release, Big was met with wide critical acclaim, particularly for Hanks' performance. It was a huge commercial success as well, grossing $151 million worldwide against a production budget of $18 million, and it proved to be pivotal to Hanks' career, establishing him as a major box-office draw as well as a critical favorite. The film received Academy Award nominations for Best Actor (Hanks) and Best Original Screenplay.

Plot 

Twelve-year-old Josh Baskin is told that he is too short for a carnival ride called the Super Loops while attempting to impress a girl. Dejected, he inserts a coin into an antique fortune-teller machine called Zoltar, and makes a wish to be "big". It dispenses a card stating "Your wish is granted", as Josh discovers the machine has been unplugged the entire time.

The next morning, Josh finds that he has grown into an adult. He tries to locate the Zoltar machine, but finds that the carnival has moved on. Returning home, he tries to explain his predicament to his mother, who chases him from the house thinking he is a stranger who has kidnapped her son. He then finds his best friend Billy and convinces him of his identity by reciting a song that only they know. With Billy's help, Josh learns that it will take at least six weeks to find the Zoltar machine again, so Josh rents a room in a flophouse in New York City and gets a job as a data entry clerk at the MacMillan Toy Company.

Josh meets the company's owner, Mr. MacMillan, at FAO Schwarz, and impresses him with his insight into current toys and his child-like enthusiasm. They play duets ("Heart and Soul" and Chopsticks) on the store's Walking Piano, and MacMillan invites Josh to a massive marketing campaign pitch meeting with senior executives. Unimpressed with the toy being pitched, Josh shocks and challenges the executives with a simple declaration that the toy is not fun, and while his follow-up suggestions invigorate the team for new ideas, he earns the animosity of Paul Davenport, the pitch's leader. Meanwhile, a pleased MacMillan promotes Josh to Vice President of Product Development. He soon attracts the attention of Susan Lawrence, a fellow executive, and a romance begins to develop, much to the dismay of her former boyfriend, Davenport. Josh becomes increasingly entwined in his adult life by spending time with Susan, mingling with her friends, and entering into a steady relationship with her. His ideas become valuable assets to MacMillan Toys; however, he begins to forget what it is like to be a child, and his tight schedule rarely allows him to spend time with Billy.
 
MacMillan asks Josh to come up with proposals for a new line of toys. He is intimidated by the need to formulate the business aspects of the proposal, but Susan says that she will handle the business end while he comes up with the ideas. Nevertheless, he feels pressured and longs for his old life. When he expresses doubts to Susan and attempts to explain that he is a child, she interprets this as fear of commitment on his part and dismisses his explanation.
 
Josh learns from Billy that the Zoltar machine is now at Sea Point Park, and he leaves in the middle of his presentation to MacMillan and the other executives. Susan also leaves and encounters Billy, who tells her where Josh went. At the park, Josh finds the machine, unplugs it, and makes a wish to become a kid again. He is then confronted by Susan for running off, but upon seeing the machine and the fortune, she realizes that he was telling the truth, and becomes despondent at realizing their relationship will end. He tells her that he enjoyed their time together and suggests that she use the machine to wish herself younger, though she declines and offers to take him home.

After sharing an emotional goodbye with Susan, Josh transforms into a child again before reuniting with his family and Billy.

Cast
 Tom Hanks as Joshua "Josh" Baskin
 David Moscow as Young Josh Baskin 
 Elizabeth Perkins as Susan Lawrence
 Robert Loggia as Mr. MacMillan
 John Heard as Paul Davenport
 Jared Rushton as Billy Francis Kopecki
 Jon Lovitz as Scotty Brennen
 Mercedes Ruehl as Mrs. Baskin
 Josh Clark as Mr. Baskin
 Kimberlee M. Davis as Cynthia Benson
 Debra Jo Rupp as Miss Patterson
 Paul Herman as Schizo
 Peter McRobbie as	Executive #3

Production 
The Italian film Da grande (1987) has been said to be the inspiration for Big.

Anne's brother Steven Spielberg was attached to direct the film and wanted to cast Harrison Ford as Josh but Spielberg dropped out when his son Max was born and also due to scheduling conflicts with Empire of the Sun. Kevin Costner, Steve Guttenberg, Warren Beatty, Dennis Quaid and Matthew Modine were all offered the role of Josh, all of whom turned it down. Albert Brooks was also offered the role but turned it down as he didn't want to play a kid. John Travolta wanted to play Josh, but the studio wasn't interested in casting him. Sean Penn was considered for the role of Josh, but Marshall deemed him too young. Gary Busey auditioned for the role of Josh, but Marshall didn’t think he could pull off playing an adult. Andy García read for Josh, but one of the studio executives didn't want to spend $18 million for "a kid to grow to be Puerto Rican" (García is actually Cuban). Debra Winger tried to convince Marshall to rewrite Josh into a woman. Robert De Niro was cast in the lead role with Elizabeth Perkins. He later dropped out due to "scheduling conflicts" and was replaced by Tom Hanks. Hanks and Loggia made two cardboard pianos and practiced them at home, the studio hired doubles in case if Hanks and Loggia didn’t get it right.

Reception

Critical response 

The New York Times praised the performances of Moscow and Rushton, saying the film "features believable young teenage mannerisms from the two real boys in its cast and this only makes Mr. Hanks's funny, flawless impression that much more adorable." John Simon of the National Review described Big as "an accomplished, endearing, and by no means mindless fantasy".

The film was nominated for Academy Awards for Best Actor (Hanks) and Best Original Screenplay. At the Golden Globe Awards, the film was nominated for Best Motion Picture – Musical or Comedy, while Hanks won for Best Actor – Motion Picture Musical or Comedy.

On the review aggregator Rotten Tomatoes, the film scored a "Certified Fresh" 98% rating based on 80 reviews, with an average rating of 7.90/10. The website's critical consensus reads, "Refreshingly sweet and undeniably funny, Big is a showcase for Tom Hanks, who dives into his role and infuses it with charm and surprising poignancy." On Metacritic, the film has a weighted average score of 73 out of 100, based on 20 critics, indicating "generally favorable reviews." Audiences polled by CinemaScore gave the film an average grade of "A" on an A+ to F scale.

The film is number 23 on Bravo's 100 Funniest Movies. In 2000, it was ranked 42nd on the American Film Institute's "100 Years…100 Laughs" list. In June 2008, AFI named it the tenth-best film in the fantasy genre. In 2008, it was selected by Empire Magazine as one of "The 500 Greatest Movies of All Time."

Big was part of a series of twin films featuring an age-changing plot produced in the late 1980s, including Like Father Like Son (1987), 18 Again! (1988), Vice Versa (1988), 14 Going on 30 (1988),

The film is recognized by American Film Institute in these lists:
 2000: AFI's 100 Years...100 Laughs – #42
 2008: AFI's 10 Top 10: #10 Fantasy Film

Box office 
The film opened at No. 2 with $8.2 million in its first weekend. It would end up grossing over $151 million ($116 million in the US and $36 million internationally). It was the first feature film directed by a woman to gross over $100 million.

Accolades

Adaptations

Film remakes 

In 2004, an Indian remake titled New in Tamil-language starring S.J. Suryah and Naani starring Mahesh Babu in Telugu-language was released. An Indian Hindi-language remake titled Aao Wish Karein starring Aftab Shivdasani released in 2009.

Broadway musical 

In 1996, the film was made into a musical for the Broadway stage. It featured music by David Shire, lyrics by Richard Maltby Jr., and a book by John Weidman. Directed by Mike Ockrent, and choreographed by Susan Stroman, it opened on April 28, 1996, and closed on October 13, 1996, after 193 performances.

Television show 
The first attempt at adapting the film as a TV series came in 1990, with a sitcom pilot produced for CBS that starred Bruce Norris as Josh, Alison LaPlaca as Susan, and Darren McGavin as Mr. MacMillan; it was not picked up as a series.

On September 30, 2014, Fox announced that a TV remake, loosely based on the film, was planned. Written and executive produced by Kevin Biegel and Mike Royce, it dealt with what it means to be an adult and kid in present times.

In popular culture 

The fictional Zoltar Speaks fortune-telling machine portrayed in the film was modeled after the real-life 1960s machine Zoltan, the name differing by one letter. In 2007, the Nevada-based animatronic company Characters Unlimited was awarded a trademark for Zoltar Speaks and began selling fortune-telling machines with that name.

The film is referenced in the 2019 DC Extended Universe film Shazam!. In the scene in which Doctor Sivana chases Billy Batson into a toy store, Billy unknowingly steps onto a Walking Piano and briefly plays it before being knocked out a window by Sivana. Additionally, both films' plots center around a child who is magically transformed into an adult.

An Easter egg made an appearance in The Order season 2, episode 2, entitled "Free Radicals, Part 2." In the episode, Alyssa shows Jack (Jake Manley) their vault of magical artifacts, which is described by Alyssa as "the beating heart of the Order." This place has everything from Excalibur to the Ark of the Covenant. While there, a Zoltar fortune-telling machine from Big catches Jack's eye. Alyssa explains that it's an "enchanted" Zoltar machine that makes wishes come true. After Jack says he wishes to know his major, Alyssa quickly warns him that Zoltar is a "bit of a trickster" who "grants your wishes ironically." The machine, which is among the artifacts stolen by the demon summoned by the Knights of Saint Christopher, can be spotted in multiple episodes.

See also 
 Little – A similar film

References

External links 

 
 
 

1980s American films
1980s coming-of-age comedy films
1980s English-language films
1980s fantasy comedy films
1988 romantic comedy films
1988 films
20th Century Fox films
American coming-of-age comedy films
American fantasy comedy films
American romantic comedy films
Films about size change
Films about wish fulfillment
Films adapted into plays
Films directed by Penny Marshall
Films featuring a Best Musical or Comedy Actor Golden Globe winning performance
Films produced by James L. Brooks
Films produced by Robert Greenhut
Films scored by Howard Shore
Films set in New Jersey
Films set in New York City
Films shot in Fort Lee, New Jersey
Films shot in New Jersey
Films shot in New York City
Films about rapid human age change
Films with screenplays by Gary Ross
Gracie Films films
Magic realism films
Workplace comedy films